Asensi is a Spanish  surname. Notable people with the surname include:

Alex Asensi (born 1984), Spanish photographer and Pingpongo player
François Asensi (born 1945), Member of the National Assembly of France
Juan Manuel Asensi (born 1949), Spanish footballer 
Julia de Asensi (1859–1921), Spanish journalist, translator and writer
Matilde Asensi (born 1962), Spanish journalist and writer
Neus Asensi (born 1965), Spanish actress
Vicente Asensi (1919–2000), Spanish footballer

See also
Asensio

References

 
Spanish-language surnames